Volodymyr Zhylin (born February 26, 1959) is a retired Soviet football player and Ukrainian coach.

Player career
Volodymyr Zhylin, started his career in CSKA Kyiv, and with the team got second in *Championship of the Ukrainian SSR in 1977. In 1978 he moved to Dnipro Cherkasy. In 1985 he moved to Ros Bila Tserkva and in 1986 he played for Desna Chernihiv until 1987. In 1989, he moved to Polissya Zhytomyr in Soviet Second League and from 1992 until 1995 he moved to Tekstylnyk Chernihiv, that recently the name was changed in Cheksyl Chernihiv and he won the Chernihiv Oblast Football Championship in 1992 In the season 1993/1994 he got 4th in the league.

Coach career
From 1997 until 1998 he was appointed as Desna Chernihiv, then in 2007 he become the coach of the female football team Lehenda Chernihiv. With the club in got third place in Ukrainian Women's League and second in the Women's Cup in 2007.

Honours
As Player
CSKA Kyiv
Championship of the Ukrainian SSR: Runner-up 1977

Tekstylnyk Chernihiv
Chernihiv Oblast Football Championship: 1992

References

External links
Profile on footballfacts.ru 

1959 births
Living people
Footballers from Chernihiv
Soviet footballers
Ukrainian footballers
SKA Kiev players
FC Dnipro Cherkasy players
FC Desna Chernihiv players
FC Cheksyl Chernihiv players
FC Polissya Zhytomyr players
FC Desna Chernihiv managers
WFC Lehenda-ShVSM Chernihiv managers
Association footballers not categorized by position